Zeltner is a surname. Notable people with the surname include:

Bruno Zeltner (born 1967), Swiss sailor
Gustav Georg Zeltner (1672–1738), German theologian
Jürg Zeltner (1967–2020), Swiss businessman
Michelle Zeltner (born 1991), Swiss heptathlete
Paul E. Zeltner (1925–2018), American politician
Thomas Zeltner (born 1947), Swiss physician, lawyer and politician
Trevor Zeltner (born 1951), Australian rules footballer